Ozro Thurston Jones Sr. (March 26, 1891 – September 23, 1972) was a Holiness Pentecostal denomination leader and minister, who was the second Senior Bishop of the Church of God in Christ, Inc. (1962–1968), succeeding Bishop Charles Harrison Mason, who was the founder. The Church of God in Christ (COGIC) is the  fourth largest denomination in the United States, being in the Holiness Pentecostal tradition.

Early life
Ozro Thurston (O.T.) Jones was born in Fort Smith, Arkansas, the son of Baptist parents, Marion and Mary Jones. As a young man, in 1912, he experienced and confessed salvation and "Spirit baptism" or "infilling" as a second work of grace. He answered a call to the ministry under the guidance of Elder Justus Bowe, a COGIC pioneer. Soon afterwards, he, his older sister and a brother developed into an evangelistic team in North Arkansas and the surrounding states. Over the next few years 18 congregations were established as a direct result of their evangelistic endeavors. In 1914 Elder Jones organized the youth department of the Church of God in Christ and served as its first president. Two years later he founded and edited the Y.P.W.W. Quarterly Topics, an education-oriented journal. In 1920 he was appointed assistant to the state overseer in Oklahoma.

Pastorship
In 1925, Jones' career took a decisive turn when he became pastor of a small congregation of Holiness believers in Philadelphia. He moved to Philadelphia where he would reside for the rest of his life. The congregation grew into the historic Holy Temple Church of God in Christ. In 1926 he became the state overseer for Pennsylvania. Not forgetting his work with the youth of the church, in 1928 he founded the International Youth Congress of the Church of God in Christ.

In 1933 Bishop Charles Harrison Mason, the founder of the Church of God in Christ, selected Jones as one of the five men to be consecrated as the denomination's first "founding" bishops. He was later selected to serve on the executive commission created by Mason to assist him during his last years in office. Following Mason's death in November 1961, the commission then headed by Bishop A.B. McEwen, administered the affairs of the church for one year. Then in late 1962, the board of bishops moved to nominate a new senior bishop. They chose Jones and placed his name before the church's general assembly, which approved the motion. Jones retained authorship of the Y.P.W.W. Topics and he remained Jurisdictional Bishop of the Commonwealth of Pennsylvania. At no time did Bishop Jones Sr. give up any of his offices.

Senior Bishop of the Church of God in Christ
Events moved smoothly for the first few years of Jones' tenure, but opposition began to appear in 1965. Voices rose demanding regular elections for the office of a presiding bishop. The situation threatened to split the denomination, and a number of lawsuits answered with counter-lawsuits were filed. The courts finally ordered an election, and in 1968 a constitutional convention held its first session on January 30, 1968. The convention established clear guidelines for the election of church leaders, and later that year the elections were held. Eventually, James Oglethorpe Patterson was elected presiding bishop. This effectively removed Bishop O. T. Jones Sr. from office. He remained Jurisdictional Bishop in Pennsylvania.

Personal life and death
In 1921, Jones married Neanza Williams in St. Louis, Missouri. To this union were born six children. Dr. O. T. Jones Jr., Walter B. Jones, Dr. William V. Jones Sr., Mrs. Jean Anderson, Mrs. Elma Harriet Freeman and Mrs. Marian Ellison. Bishop Jones died on September 23, 1972 in Wynnewood, PA after a protracted illness. He was 81. His son, Dr. O. T. Jones Jr., then assumed the pastorship of Holy Temple and became Jurisdictional Bishop of the Commonwealth of Pennsylvania Jurisdiction.

References

External links 
 Succession of Church of God in Christ Leaders

 http://cogicofpa.com/aboutus/history.html

Church of God in Christ pastors
Senior Bishops of the Church of God in Christ
American Pentecostals
American bishops
1891 births
1972 deaths